BaDoinkVR is a virtual reality porn production company founded in 2006. It is the AVN Awards 2018 VR Site of the Year award winner. Sister sites include BaDoink VIP, VRCosplayX, 18VR, RealVR, and BabeVR. BaDoinkVR is headquartered in Rochester, New York with satellite offices in Barcelona, Spain and Silicon Valley. The company was the first to drive mass consumer trial of VR adult videos by seeding the market with 20,000 free virtual reality cardboard goggles.

History

Founded in 2006, BaDoink was initially launched as a premier online adult entertainment site with a proprietary technology platform. In 2015, the company expanded its platform and content production to focus on virtual reality with the launch of BaDoinkVR.

The web site features 360 and 180-degree immersive videos, motion tracking and binaural audio. Videos on BaDoinkVR.com can be viewed with Oculus Go, Oculus Rift, PlayStation VR, HTC Vive, Samsung Gear VR and Google Cardboard with an iOS or Android smartphone using BaDoink’s VR Player, a virtual reality app that is compatible with the devices listed.

The first videos launched by the company were in 4K resolution. As the industry developed, BaDoinkVR started producing higher resolution 5K videos. At present, their videos are shot and released in 7K resolution. The increase in video quality aims to keep up with the release of new headsets capable of playing high-resolution videos, like Meta Quest 2, HP Reverb G2, and Pico Neo 3 Link.

As of early 2016, BaDoinkVR is consistently listed as one of the top three leading companies in virtual reality porn.

Teledildonics and haptic technology

In February 2016, BaDoinkVR announced a partnership with Amsterdam based sex-technology manufacturer KIIROO, who have been developing sex toys embedded with manufacturer of haptic technology, also known as teledildonics. This collaboration between allowed viewers to sync their KIIROO devices to adult VR videos in real-time. Their sex toys, like KIIROO Keon or KIIROO Pulse, are able to connect remotely using an internet connection, which allows the paired devices to send haptic feedback to one another through kinaesthetic movements, vibrations and pulsations. The two-way flow of remote connection and haptic touch feedback facilitates the simulation of sexual relations over a distance. The two companies have also worked together on collaborative projects producing virtual reality videos focusing on sex education and virtual sexology. In the VR film, actors guide viewers through solo masturbation techniques using sex-technology and guidance from therapists. Their collaborative video was one of the first efforts to combine both sexology, sexual therapy and virtual reality into accessible and affordable media outlets.

Malware claims
In May 2015, BaDoink was notified that the brand and logo, disguised as the BaDoink Ultra App, were being used to spread the Reveton/IcePol ransomware. They identified the site that was distributing the ransomware, and proceeded to remedy the situation, alerting the site's hosting company, and submitting a DMCA takedown request. The company was also in contact with the FBI Cyber Division and sent a cease and desist to the owners of the domain names as well.

Awards

 2016 Internet Company of the Year - Free Speech Coalition
 2016 Adult Site of the Year: Virtual Reality  - XBIZ Award
 2018 VR Site of the Year - AVN Awards

Ranking 
As of July 2021, BaDoinkVR has a traffic ranking of 161,568.

References

External links
 

Technology companies established in 2006
Virtual reality companies
2006 establishments in New York (state)
Virtual reality organizations